The Albert, formerly the Griswold Building, is a former office building named after architect  Albert Kahn, located at 1214 Griswold Street in Downtown Detroit, Michigan. It was listed on the National Register of Historic Places in 1980 and is part of the Capitol Park Historic District. In 2014, it was renovated into apartments.

History
The Griswold Building was built in 1929 as an office building, on the former site of the Miles Theatre, and was later converted to residential use in the 1980s as senior apartment building.

The Albert was renovated as of fall 2014. The renovation converted the building's HUD Section-8 senior housing to 127 market-rate apartments, with 14,000 square feet of retail space on the building's first floor.

Description
The Albert stands 12 floors in height, with 127 units/rooms. The high-rise was designed by Albert Kahn in the Art Moderne architectural style, and is significant as an example of the architect's transition from Art Deco to Art Moderne. The façade is divided into two sections: a lower, three-story portion faced with limestone and divided into nine bays, and an upper, nine-story portion constructed of brick with five center bays set back from the main façade.

References

External links
The Albert—Website
The Albert, Fun and stylish highlights the architect's design—Detroit News January 8, 2015
Google Maps location of The Albert

Apartment buildings in Detroit
Residential skyscrapers in Detroit
Residential buildings completed in 1929
Residential buildings on the National Register of Historic Places in Michigan
Historic district contributing properties in Michigan
National Register of Historic Places in Detroit
Albert Kahn (architect) buildings